Enevold Steenblock Høyum (15 May 1775 – 24 January 1830) was a Norwegian military officer who served as a representative at the Norwegian Constitutional Assembly.

He was born at Sauherad in Telemark, Norway. He was the oldest of six siblings. The family moved to Haug gård in Sauherad during his youth. He entered military service and in 1794 became Second Lieutenant in Telemark Infantry Regiment (Tellemarkske Infanterie Regiment). He advanced through the ranks became Captain in 1809.

Together with Commander Gullik Madsen Røed, he represented Telemark Infantry Regiment at the Norwegian Constituent Assembly at Eidsvoll in 1814. They both voted with the independence party (Selvstendighetspartiet).

In 1810, he married Edel Maria Thornson with whom he was the father of six children.  After his retirement from military service, they lived on Søve gård at Holla in Telemark.

References

External links
Representantene på Eidsvoll 1814 (Cappelen Damm AS)

Related Reading
Holme, Jørn  (2014) De kom fra alle kanter – Eidsvollsmennene og deres hus (Oslo: Cappelen Damm)  

1775 births
1830 deaths
People from Sauherad
Norwegian Army personnel
Norwegian military personnel of the Napoleonic Wars
Fathers of the Constitution of Norway